William Roldán Mora (born 23 May 1973) is a Colombian long-distance runner. He competed in the men's 5000 metres at the 1996 Summer Olympics.

References

1973 births
Living people
Athletes (track and field) at the 1996 Summer Olympics
Colombian male long-distance runners
Olympic athletes of Colombia
Place of birth missing (living people)